Mexico–United Kingdom relations are the bilateral relations between Mexico and the United Kingdom. Both nations are members of the G-20 major economies, Organisation for Economic Co-operation and Development and the United Nations.

History  

After Mexico achieved its independence in September 1821, Britain was the first European great power to recognize Mexican sovereignty. Soon afterwards, Emperor Agustín de Iturbide sent a diplomatic envoy to London to establish diplomatic communications between the two nations. In 1837, both nations ratified a Treaty of Amity, Commerce and Navigation, to abolish the slave trade.  The British established a network of merchant houses in the major cities. According to historian Hilarie J. Heath, the results were bleak:
Trade was stagnant, imports did not pay, contraband drove prices down, debts private and public went unpaid, merchants suffered all manner of injustices and operated at the mercy of weak and corruptible governments, commercial houses skirted bankruptcy.

In November 1838, Mexico was involved in a brief war with France known as the Pastry War. Britain supported Mexico and intervened to find a diplomatic solution to end the war. In March 1839, Mexico and France ended their war when Mexico acquiesced to French demands.

In 1861, Mexican President Benito Juárez suspended Mexico's interest payments to its creditors in France, Spain, and Britain. This act angered the three nations and in October 1861 the Convention of London was signed by the three nations to send joint navy ships to Mexico as a show of force to demand repayment by the Mexican government. In December 1861 the "triple-alliance" took the port of Veracruz and nearby towns. After a few months, both the Spanish and British government became evidently aware that Emperor Napoleon III of France was planning to initiate regime change in Mexico in order to expand its empire and take advantage of the fact that the United States was involved in its civil war (1861-65) and was not able to implement the Monroe Doctrine. The U.S. did not recognize the regime propped up by French troops.  In early 1862, Britain and Spain pulled its forces from Mexico. This French invasion would later be known as the  Second French intervention in Mexico. In 1864, France installed a puppet emperor in Mexico thus creating the Second Mexican Empire which lasted until 1867 with the execution of Emperor Maximilian I of Mexico Britain had recognized his government, despite President Juárez never leaving the national territory. It nearly took 20 years for diplomatic relations to be restored, which was accomplished during the tenure of President Porfirio Díaz.  Díaz was a liberal Army general who had defended Mexico against the foreign invasion.

After 1880, the British turned their attention in Mexico primarily to investments in railways and mines, sending both money and engineers and skilled mechanics. The British invested £7.4 million in railways during the decade of the 1880s, jumping to £53.4 million in 1910s. The decade-total of new investment in mining went from £1.3 million in 1880s to £11.6 million in 1910s. Investments in land and other properties rose from near zero in 1880s to £19.7 million in 1910s. The totals reached £135 million, almost as much as the United States. In 1900, there were 2800 British citizens living in Mexico, a relatively small number in contrast to the 15,000 Americans, 16,000 Spaniards, 4000 French, and 2,600 Germans. The British were famed for their sophisticated clubs, and their elaborate sports program - English football became a highly popular sport across Mexico; while cricket found no interest amongst the Mexican populace.

During World War I (1914-1918), Mexico was neutral while involved in its own civil war (1910-1920). In 1917 British intelligence intercepted the Zimmermann Telegram, and gave it to the United States government. Zimmermann was the German Foreign Minister who tried to induce Mexico to join the war against the United States in the hope of diverting American attention away from Europe. Mexico ignored the offer since it realized that its weak military would be quickly overwhelmed by the Americans.

In March 1938, President Lázaro Cárdenas expropriated all oil reserves, facilities, and foreign oil companies in Mexico. The British government, alongside the United States government, demanded compensation from the expropriation which the Mexican government refused to pay. As a result, diplomatic relations between the two nations were severed. Although relations were restored in 1942, the British government held out until 1947 in regards to demanding payment and was duly recompensated for the expropriation.

In May 1942, Mexico declared war on the Axis Powers during World War II, thus officially entering on the side of the Allies. As a result of this, diplomatic relations between Mexico and the UK were re-established. Mexico was one of only two Latin-American countries to send soldiers abroad to fight in World War II (the second country being Brazil). In 1944, both nations elevated their diplomatic representations to the level of embassies, and Sir Charles Bateman became the first British ambassador in Mexico and Alfonso Rosenzweig Diaz became the first Mexican ambassador to the United Kingdom. After the war, bilateral relations between the two nations normalized and trade re-commenced. In 1966, the first direct flights between Mexico City and London were inaugurated.

During the Falklands War (April - June 1982), Mexico remained neutral during the conflict, however, it was well known that the Mexican government did not support the military junta in Argentina at the time and secretly supported the UK.

Relations in the 21st century

The Year of Mexico in the United Kingdom and the Year of the United Kingdom in Mexico, taking place in 2015, was a year of extensive, diverse and stimulating exchanges between Mexican and British people in terms of art, culture, science, the academic sector, business and tourism. Initially, it was to be a solely cultural project agreed between the chairman of the National Council for Culture and the Arts of Mexico, Rafael Tovar y de Teresa, and the Minister for Culture, Communications and Creative Industries of the United Kingdom, Edward Vaizey on 4 July 2013. Subsequently, the ministries of foreign affairs of both countries decided to expand the scope of the Dual Year to other areas.

The many cultural events that took place in the United Kingdom included exhibitions of artists such as the British-born Mexican artist Leonora Carrington and Carlos Amorales; a folkloric Mexican dance spectacle by the Ballet Folklórico de México; a Lucha libre show at the Royal Albert Hall, as well as many seminars and concerts. Mexico was the guest of honor at the 2015 London Book Fair.

In Mexico, a special drama series, "Los británicos" (The British), production of the BBC and British Council, aired on Canal 22 in February–April. Art exhibitions include artists such as Michael Landy, Stephen Willats and Simon Starling. The UK will be the guest of honor at the Feria de las Culturas Amigas held in Mexico City and the Guadalajara International Book Fair.

In March 2015, President Enrique Peña Nieto, accompanied by the First Lady, Angélica Rivera, paid a state visit to the United Kingdom.

In September 2022, Mexican Foreign Minister Marcelo Ebrard flew to London to represent Mexico and attend the State funeral of Queen Elizabeth II.

High-level visits

Presidential visits from Mexico to the United Kingdom

 President Luis Echeverría (1973)
 President Miguel de la Madrid Hurtado (1985)
 President Carlos Salinas de Gortari (1990, 1992)
 President Ernesto Zedillo (1996, 1998)
 President Vicente Fox (2002, 2005)
 President Felipe Calderón (2007, 2009)
 President Enrique Peña Nieto (2013, 2015)

Royal and Prime Ministerial visits from the United Kingdom to Mexico

 Queen Elizabeth II (1975, 1983)
 Prime Minister Margaret Thatcher (1981)
 Charles, Prince of Wales (1966, 1970, 1993, 2002, 2014)
 Prime Minister Tony Blair (2002)
 Prime Minister David Cameron (2012)

Bilateral agreements
Both nations have signed several bilateral agreements such as an Extradition Treaty (1886); Agreement for the Transmission of Diplomatic Pouches (1946); Agreement for Consular Relations (1954); Agreement of Scientific and Technical Cooperation (1975); Agreement of Cultural Cooperation (1975); Agreement of Air Transportation (1988); Agreement of Cooperation in the Fight Against the Illicit Traffic and Abuse of Narcotic Drugs and Psychotropic Substances (1990); Agreement to Avoid Double Taxation and Prevent Tax Evasion in Taxes on Income and Capital Gains (1994); Agreement of Mutual Assistance in the Investigation, Assurance and Confiscation of Criminal Products and Instruments different from those of the Traffic of Narcotic Drugs (1996); Treaty on the Execution of Criminal Sentences (2004); Agreement for the Promotion and Reciprocal Protection of Investments (2006) and an Agreement on Mutual Recognition of Studies, Degrees, Diplomas and Academic Degrees of Higher Education between both nations (2015).

Trade

In 1997, Mexico signed a Free Trade Agreement with the European Union, of which the United Kingdom was a member until 2020. Since the implementation of the free trade agreement in 2000, trade between the two nations has increased dramatically. In 2018, two-way trade between Mexico and the UK reached over US$4.6 billion. Mexico exports to the UK include: gold, automobile parts, beer and other electrical equipment. British exports to Mexico include: alcohol, medicine, transistors and various other products. Mexico's trade with the UK amounted to 7.5% of total trade within the EU. Between 1999 and 2012, British companies invested over US$8 billion in Mexico and over one thousand British companies have set up shop in Mexico.

Transportation
There are direct flights between both nations with the following airlines: Aeroméxico, British Airways, TUI Airways and Virgin Atlantic.

Drug trafficking
It has been reported that Mexican drug cartels have been using the port city of Liverpool for smuggling cocaine into Britain and Europe. In 2012, it was reported that the Sinaloa Cartel had drug distribution networks in England. In 2013, Scotland Yard broke a cocaine importation ring involving corrupt British Airways cargo workers at Heathrow Airport importing cocaine from Mexico City.

In 2017, it was reported that the Sinaloa Cartel had formed a pact with a Romanian crime syndicate who had control over transportation, which would allow the cartel to operate in Britain. A spokesperson for the National Crime Agency said "intelligence indicates that the Romanian OCG [organised crime group] are still being supplied by a Mexican OCG linked to the Sinaloa cartel. It is assessed that this network of OCGs will continue to supply large volumes of class A drugs into the UK."

Resident diplomatic missions 
 Mexico has an embassy in London.
 United Kingdom has an embassy in Mexico City, a consulate-general in Cancún and a consulate in Monterrey.

See also 
 British immigration to Mexico
 Cornish diaspora
 Mexicans in the United Kingdom

References 

 
United Kingdom
Bilateral relations of the United Kingdom